Gilbert Emptaz (born 12 February 1950) is a French former sports shooter. He competed at the 1972 Summer Olympics and the 1976 Summer Olympics.

References

1950 births
Living people
French male sport shooters
Olympic shooters of France
Shooters at the 1972 Summer Olympics
Shooters at the 1976 Summer Olympics
Place of birth missing (living people)
20th-century French people